Tragopogon pratensis (common names Jack-go-to-bed-at-noon, meadow salsify, showy goat's-beard or meadow goat's-beard) is a biennial plant in the family Asteraceae, distributed across Europe and North America, commonly growing in fields (hence its name) and on roadsides.  It is found in North America from southern Ontario to Massachusetts; most of England; on the eastern and southern edges of Scotland; and central Ireland but not the coastal edges.

It flowers between June and October and its flowers have a diameter of 3–5 cm. The root and buds are edible, and it has a milky latex.

Description

It differs from viper's-grass (Scorzonera humilis) in that viper's-grass has short, pale green bracts, whereas in goat's-beard they are long and pointed.

The lower leaves are 10 to 30 cm long, lanceolate, keeled lengthwise, grey-green, pointed, hairless, with a white midrib.  The upper leaves are shorter and more erect. It is the only United Kingdom dandelion type flower with grass like leaves.

The flower heads are 5 cm wide.  They only open in the morning sunshine, hence the name 'Jack go to bed at noon'.

The achenes  are rough, long beaked pappus radiating outwards interwoven like a spider's web of fine white side hairs (referred to as a "blowball").

Uses 
The roots can be boiled and eaten like potatoes. The young shoots can also be used in diabetic salads.

In Armenia, rural kids make bubble gum from the juice of meadow salsify. For this purpose, when milky juice is released from the torn stems it is collected on the walls of a glass and dried.

References

pratensis